The women's épée competition in fencing at the 2012 Olympic Games in London was held on 30 July at the ExCeL Exhibition Centre.

Yana Shemyakina from Ukraine won the gold medal. After a time-keeping error by a games volunteer in the second semi final, Shin A-Lam controversially lost her match to her German opponent in extra time.

Schedule 
All times are British Summer Time (UTC+1)

Results

Finals

Top half

Section 1

Section 2

Bottom half

Section 3

Section 4

Results

References

Women's epee
2012 in women's fencing
Women's events at the 2012 Summer Olympics